North American moths represent about 12,000 types of moths. In comparison, there are about 825 species of North American butterflies. The moths (mostly nocturnal) and butterflies (mostly diurnal) together make up the taxonomic order Lepidoptera.

This list is sorted on MONA number (MONA is short for Moths of America North of Mexico). A numbering system for North American moths introduced by Ronald W. Hodges, et al. in 1983 in the publication Check List of the Lepidoptera of America North of Mexico. The list has since been updated, but the placement in families is outdated for some species.

This list covers America north of Mexico (effectively, the continental United States and Canada). For a list of moths and butterflies recorded from the state of Hawaii, see List of Lepidoptera of Hawaii.

This is a partial list, covering moths with MONA numbers ranging from 7649 to 8321. For the rest of the list, see List of moths of North America.

Uraniidae and Sematuridae
7649 – Epiplema incolorata
7650 – Callizzia amorata, gray scoopwing moth
7651 – Callizzia certiorara
7652 – Antiplecta triangularis
7653 – Calledapteryx dryopterata, brown scoopwing moth
7654 – Philagraula slossoniae
7655 – Erosia incendiata
7656 – Schidax coronaria
7657 – Anurapteryx crenulata
7657.1 – Psamathia placidaria
7657.2 – Trotorhombia metachromata
7658 – Urania fulgens

Mimallonidae
7659 – Lacosoma chiridota, scalloped sack-bearer moth
7660 – Lacosoma arizonicum, southwestern sack-bearer moth
7661 – Naniteta elassa
7662 – Cicinnus melsheimeri, Melsheimer's sack-bearer moth

Bombycidae
7663 – Apatelodes torrefacta, spotted apatelodes moth
7664 – Apatelodes pudefacta
7665 – Olceclostera angelica, angel moth
7666 – Olceclostera indistincta, indistinct angel moth
7667 – Olceclostera seraphica, seraph moth
7668 – Bombyx mori, silkworm moth

Lasiocampidae
7669 – Hypopacha grisea
7670 – Tolype velleda, large tolype moth
7671 – Tolype austella
7672 – Tolype mayelisae
7673 – Tolype laricis, larch tolype moth
7674 – Tolype notialis, small tolype moth
7675 – Tolype minta, southern tolype moth
7676 – Tolype glenwoodii
7677 – Tolype distincta
7678 – Tolype nigricaria
7679 – Tolype dayi
7680 – Tolype lowriei
7681 – Apotolype brevicrista
7682 – Apotolype blanchardi
7683 – Artace cribrarius, dot-lined white moth
7684 – Artace colaria
7685 – Heteropacha rileyana, Riley's lappet moth
7686 – Phyllodesma occidentis, southern lappet moth
7687 – Phyllodesma americana, lappet moth
7688 – Phyllodesma coturnix
7689 – Caloecia juvenalis
7690 – Caloecia entima
7691 – Quadrina diazoma
7692 – Dicogaster coronada
7693 – Gloveria howardi
7694 – Gloveria medusa
7695 – Gloveria gargamelle
7696 – Gloveria arizonensis
7697 – Gloveria sphingiformis
7698 – Malacosoma disstria, forest tent caterpillar moth
7699 – Malacosoma constricta, Pacific tent caterpillar moth
7700 – Malacosoma tigris, Sonoran tent caterpillar moth
7701 – Malacosoma americana, eastern tent caterpillar moth
7702 – Malacosoma californica, western tent caterpillar moth
7703 – Malacosoma incurva, southwestern tent caterpillar moth

Saturniidae
7704 – Eacles imperialis, imperial moth
7705 – Eacles oslari, Oslar's imperial moth
7706 – Citheronia regalis, regal moth
7707 – Citheronia splendens
7708 – Citheronia sepulcralis, pine devil moth
7709 – Sphingicampa bicolor, honey locust moth
7710 – Sphingicampa heiligbrodti
7711 – Sphingicampa hubbardi
7712 – Sphingicampa bisecta, bisected honey locust moth
7713 – Sphingicampa blanchardi
7713.1 – Sphingicampa montana
7714 – Sphingicampa albolineata
7714.1 – Sphingicampa raspa
7715 – Dryocampa rubicunda, rosy maple moth
7716 – Anisota stigma, spiny oakworm moth
7717 – Anisota manitobensis, Manitoba oakworm moth
7718 – Anisota consularis, consular oakworm moth
7719 – Anisota senatoria, orange-tipped oakworm moth
7720 – Anisota peigleri, Peigler's oakworm moth
7721 – Anisota finlaysoni, Finlayson's oakworm moth
7722 – Anisota oslari, Oslar's oakworm moth
7723 – Anisota virginiensis, pink-striped oakworm moth
7723.1 – Anisota pellucida, clear oakworm moth
7724 – Coloradia pandora, Pandora pinemoth
7725 – Coloradia doris, Doris' pinemoth
7726 – Coloradia luski, Lusk's pine moth
7726.1 – Coloradia velda
7727 – Hemileuca tricolor, tricolor buck moth
7728 – Hemileuca hualapai, Hualapai buckmoth
7729 – Hemileuca oliviae
7730 – Hemileuca maia, buck moth
7730.1 – Hemileuca species Port Arthur buck moth
7731 – Hemileuca nevadensis, Nevada buck moth
7731.1 – Hemileuca artemis
7732 – Hemileuca lucina, New England buck moth
7733 – Hemileuca grotei, Grote's buck moth
7734 – Hemileuca diana
7735 – Hemileuca juno, Juno buck moth
7736 – Hemileuca electra
7737 – Hemileuca burnsi
7738 – Hemileuca neumoegeni
7739 – Hemileuca chinatiensis
7740 – Hemileuca griffini, Griffin's sheepmoth
7741 – Hemileuca hera, Hera buckmoth
7742 – Hemileuca magnifica
7743 – Hemileuca nuttalli
7744 – Hemileuca eglanterina, elegant sheepmoth
7744.1 – Hemileuca conwayae
7744.2 – Hemileuca lex
7744.3 – Hemileuca peigleri
7744.4 – Hemileuca slosseri
7744.5 – Hemileuca stonei
7745 – Automeris randa
7746 – Automeris io, Io moth
7747 – Automeris iris, iris-eyed silkmoth
7748 – Automeris cecrops
7749 – Automeris zephyria, zephyr-eyed silkmoth
7749.1 – Automeris louisiana
7749.2 – Automeris patagoniensis
7750 – Hylesia coinopus
7750.99 – Lonomia electra
7751 – Saturnia mendocino
7752 – Saturnia walterorum
7753 – Saturnia albofasciata, white-streaked saturnia moth
7754 – Agapema galbina, greasewood moth
7754.1 – Agapema anona, Mexican agapema moth
7755 – Agapema solita
7756 – Agapema homogena
7757 – Antheraea polyphemus, Polyphemus moth
7757.1 – Antheraea oculea, western Polyphemus moth
7758 – Actias luna, luna moth
7759 – Samia cynthia, ailanthus silkmoth
7760 – Rothschildia cinctus
7761 – Rothschildia forbesi, Forbes' silkmoth
7761.1 – Rothschildia lebeau, Lebeau's silkmoth
7762 – Rothschildia orizaba, Orizaba silkmoth
7763 – Eupackardia calleta, Calleta silkmoth
7764 – Callosamia promethea, Promethea moth
7765 – Callosamia angulifera, tulip-tree silkmoth
7766 – Callosamia securifera, sweetbay silkmoth
7767 – Hyalophora cecropia, cecropia moth
7768 – Hyalophora columbia, Columbia silkmoth
7769 – Hyalophora gloveri, Glover's silkmoth
7770 – Hyalophora euryalus, ceanothus silkmoth

Sphingidae
7771 – Agrius cingulata, pink-spotted hawk moth
7772 – Cocytius antaeus, giant sphinx moth
7773 – Cocytius duponchel, Duponchel's sphinx moth
7774 – Neococytius cluentius
7775 – Manduca sexta, Carolina sphinx moth
7776 – Manduca quinquemaculatus, five-spotted hawk moth
7777 – Manduca occulta, occult sphinx moth
7778 – Manduca rustica, rustic sphinx moth
7779 – Manduca albiplaga
7780 – Manduca brontes cubensis, Cuban sphinx moth
7781 – Manduca muscosa, muscosa sphinx moth
7782 W – Manduca florestan
7783 – Manduca jasminearum, ash sphinx moth
7784 – Dolba hyloeus, pawpaw sphinx moth
7785 – Dolbogene hartwegii
7786 – Ceratomia amyntor, elm sphinx moth
7787 – Ceratomia undulosa, waved sphinx moth
7788 – Ceratomia sonorensis, Sonora sphinx moth
7789 – Ceratomia catalpae, catalpa sphinx moth
7790 – Ceratomia hageni, Hagen's sphinx moth
7790.1 – Ceratomia igualana
7791 – Isoparce cupressi, bald cypress sphinx moth
7792 W – Sagenosoma elsa, Elsa sphinx moth
7793 – Paratrea plebeja, plebeian sphinx moth
7796 – Lintneria eremitus, hermit sphinx moth
7797 – Lintneria eremitoides, sage sphinx moth
7798 W – Lintneria separatus
7799 W – Lintneria istar, Istar sphinx moth
7799.1 W – Lintneria smithi
7800 – Sphinx chisoya
7801 – Sphinx leucophaeata
7802 – Sphinx chersis, great ash sphinx moth
7803 – Sphinx vashti, Vashti sphinx moth
7804 – Sphinx libocedrus, incense cedar sphinx moth
7805 W – Sphinx perelegans, elegant sphinx moth
7806 W – Sphinx asellus
7807 – Sphinx canadensis, Canadian sphinx moth
7808 – Sphinx franckii, Franck's sphinx moth
7809 – Sphinx kalmiae, laurel sphinx moth
7810 – Sphinx gordius, apple sphinx moth
7810.1 – Sphinx poecila, northern apple sphinx moth
7811 – Sphinx luscitiosa, Clemens' sphinx moth
7812 – Sphinx drupiferarum, wild cherry sphinx moth
7813 – Sphinx dollii, Doll's sphinx moth
7814 W – Sphinx sequoiae, sequoia sphinx moth
7816 – Lapara coniferarum, southern pine sphinx moth
7817 – Lapara bombycoides, northern pine sphinx moth
7817.1 – Lapara phaeobrachycerous, Brou's sphinx moth
7818 – Protambulyx strigilis, streaked sphinx moth
7820 – Adhemarius blanchardorum, Blanchard's sphinx moth
7821 – Smerinthus jamaicensis, twin-spotted sphinx moth
7822 – Smerinthus cerisyi, one-eyed sphinx moth
7823 W – Smerinthus saliceti, unidentified smerinthus moth
7824 – Paonias excaecata, blind-eyed sphinx moth
7825 – Paonias myops, small-eyed sphinx moth
7826 – Paonias astylus, huckleberry sphinx moth
7827 – Amorpha juglandis, walnut sphinx moth
7828 – Pachysphinx modesta, big poplar sphinx moth
7829 W – Pachysphinx occidentalis, western poplar sphinx moth
7830 – Pseudosphinx tetrio, tetrio sphinx moth
7831 – Isognathus rimosa
7832 – Erinnyis alope, Alope sphinx moth
7833 – Erinnyis lassauxii, Lassaux's sphinx moth
7834 – Erinnyis ello, ello sphinx moth
7835 – Erinnyis oenotrus, oleander sphinx moth
7836 – Erinnyis crameri, Cramer's sphinx moth
7837 – Erinnyis obscura, obscure sphinx moth
7839 – Erinnyis guttularis
7839.1 – Erinnyis yucatana
7840 – Phryxus caicus, Caicus sphinx moth
7841 – Pachylia ficus, fig sphinx moth
7842 – Pachylioides resumens
7843 – Madoryx pseudothyreus, false-windowed sphinx moth
7845 – Callionima falcifera, falcifera sphinx moth
7846 – Perigonia lusca, half-blind sphinx moth
7846.1 – Eupyrrhoglossum sagra, Sagra sphinx moth
7847 – Aellopos tantalus, Tantalus sphinx moth
7848 – Aellopos clavipes, clavipes sphinx moth
7849 – Aellopos titan, titan sphinx moth
7850 – Aellopos fadus, fadus sphinx moth
7851 – Enyo lugubris, mournful sphinx moth
7852 – Enyo ocypete
7853 – Hemaris thysbe, hummingbird clearwing moth
7854 – Hemaris gracilis, slender clearwing moth
7855 B – Hemaris diffinis, snowberry clearwing moth
7855.1 W – Hemaris thetis
7856 W – Hemaris senta
7857 – Eumorpha anchemolus
7858 – Eumorpha satellitia, satellite sphinx moth
7859 – Eumorpha pandorus, Pandorus sphinx moth
7860 – Eumorpha intermedia, intermediate sphinx moth
7861 – Eumorpha achemon, Achemon sphinx moth
7862 – Eumorpha megaeacus
7863 W – Eumorpha typhon, Typhon sphinx moth
7864 – Eumorpha vitis, vine sphinx moth
7865 – Eumorpha fasciatus, banded sphinx moth
7866 – Eumorpha labruscae, gaudy sphinx moth
7867 – Cautethia grotei, Grote's sphinx moth
7868 – Cautethia spuria, spurious sphinx moth
7869 – Cautethia yucatana
7870 – Sphecodina abbottii, Abbot's sphinx moth
7871 – Deidamia inscriptum, lettered sphinx moth
7872 W – Arctonotus lucidus, Pacific green sphinx moth
7873 – Amphion floridensis, Nessus sphinx moth
7874 – Proserpinus gaurae, proud sphinx moth
7875 – Proserpinus juanita, Juanita sphinx moth
7876 W – Proserpinus clarkiae, Clark's day sphinx moth
7877 – Proserpinus flavofasciata, yellow-banded day sphinx moth
7878 W – Proserpinus vega
7879 – Proserpinus terlooii, Baron Terloo's sphinx moth
7880 W – Euproserpinus phaeton, Phaeton primrose sphinx moth
7881 W – Euproserpinus euterpe
7882 W – Euproserpinus wiesti
7884 – Darapsa versicolor, hydrangea sphinx moth
7885 – Darapsa myron, Virginia creeper sphinx moth
7886 – Darapsa choerilus, azalea sphinx moth
7887 – Xylophanes pluto, Pluto sphinx moth
7888 – Xylophanes porcus, porcu sphinx moth
7889 W – Xylophanes falco, falcon sphinx moth
7890 – Xylophanes tersa, tersa sphinx moth
7891 – Xylophanes libya
7891.1 – Xylophanes ceratomioides
7892 – Hyles euphorbiae, leafy spurge hawk moth
7893 – Hyles gallii, gallium sphinx moth
7894 – Hyles lineata, white-lined sphinx moth
7894.1 – Deilephila elpenor, elephant hawk moth

Notodontidae
7895 – Clostera albosigma, sigmoid prominent moth
7896 – Clostera inclusa, angle-lined prominent moth
7897 – Clostera inornata
7898 – Clostera strigosa, striped chocolate-tip moth
7899 – Clostera paraphora
7900 – Clostera brucei
7901 – Clostera apicalis, apical prominent moth
7902 – Datana ministra, yellow-necked caterpillar moth
7903 – Datana angusii, Angus's datana moth
7904 – Datana drexelii, Drexel's datana moth
7905 – Datana major, major datana moth
7906 – Datana contracta, contracted datana moth
7907 – Datana integerrima, walnut caterpillar moth
7908 – Datana perspicua, spotted datana moth
7909 – Datana robusta
7910 – Datana modesta
7911 – Datana ranaeceps, post-burn datana moth
7912 – Datana diffidens
7913 – Datana neomexicana
7914 – Datana chiriquensis
7915 – Nadata gibbosa, white-dotted prominent moth
7916 – Nadata oregonensis
7917 – Hyperaeschra georgica, Georgian prominent moth
7918 – Hyperaeschra tortuosa
7919 – Peridea basitriens, oval-based prominent moth
7920 – Peridea angulosa, angulose prominent moth
7921 – Peridea ferruginea, chocolate prominent moth
7922 – Pheosia rimosa, black-rimmed prominent moth
7924 – Odontosia elegans, elegant prominent moth
7925 – Odontosia grisea
7926 – Notodonta scitipennis, finned-willow prominent moth
7927 – Notodonta pacifica
7928 – Notodonta torva, northern finned prominent moth
7929 – Nerice bidentata, double-toothed prominent moth
7930 – Ellida caniplaga, linden prominent moth
7931 – Gluphisia septentrionis, common gluphisia moth
7932 – Gluphisia wrightii
7933 – Gluphisia avimacula, four-spotted gluphisia moth
7934 – Gluphisia lintneri, Lintner's gluphisia moth
7935 – Gluphisia severa
7936 – Furcula borealis, white furcula moth
7937 – Furcula cinerea, gray furcula moth
7938 – Furcula nivea
7939 – Furcula occidentalis, western furcula moth
7940 – Furcula scolopendrina, zigzag furcula moth
7941 – Furcula modesta, modest furcula moth
7942 – Cerura scitiscripta, black-etched prominent moth
7943 – Cerura candida
7944 – Cerura rarata
7945 – Nystalea indiana
7946 – Nystalea collaris
7947 – Nystalea eutalanta
7948 – Elymiotis notodontoides
7949 – Hippia packardii
7950 – Hippia insularis
7951 – Symmerista albifrons, white-headed prominent moth
7952 – Symmerista canicosta, red-humped oakworm moth
7953 – Symmerista leucitys, orange-humped mapleworm moth
7954 – Symmerista sauvis
7955 – Symmerista zacualpana
7956 – Pentobesa valta
7957 – Dasylophia anguina, black-spotted prominent moth
7958 – Dasylophia thyatiroides, gray-patched prominent moth
7959 – Dasylophia seriata
7960 – Notela jaliscana
7961 – Didugua argentilinea, silvered prominent moth
7962 – Afilia oslari
7963 – Scevesia angustiora
7964 – Cargida pyrrha
7965 – Rifargia bichorda
7966 – Rifargia distinguenda
7967 – Rifargia lineata
7968 – Litodonta hydromeli
7969 – Litodonta contrasta
7970 – Litodonta wymola
7971 – Litodonta aonides
7972 – Litodonta gigantea
7973 – Litodonta alpina
7974 – Misogada unicolor, drab prominent moth
7975 – Macrurocampa marthesia, mottled prominent moth
7976 – Macrurocampa dorothea
7977 – Heterocampa astarte
7978 – Heterocampa astartoides
7979 – Heterocampa simulans
7980 – Heterocampa rufinans
7981 – Heterocampa secessionis
7982 – Heterocampa varia
7983 – Heterocampa obliqua, oblique heterocampa moth
7984 – Heterocampa cubana
7985 – Heterocampa subrotata, small heterocampa moth
7986 – Heterocampa ditta
7987 – Heterocampa benitensis
7988 – Heterocampa belfragei
7989 – Heterocampa incongrua
7990 – Heterocampa umbrata, white-blotched heterocampa moth
7991 – Heterocampa averna
7992 – Heterocampa amanda
7993 – Heterocampa lunata
7994 – Heterocampa guttivitta, saddled prominent moth
7995 – Heterocampa biundata, wavy-lined heterocampa moth
7996 – Heterocampa ruficornis
7997 – Heterocampa zayasi
7998 – Lochmaeus manteo, variable oakleaf caterpillar moth
7999 – Lochmaeus bilineata, double-lined prominent moth
7999.1 – Disphragis captiosa
8000 – Theroa zethus
8001 – Praeschausia zapata
8002 – Ursia noctuiformis
8003 – Ursia furtiva
8004 – Schizura biedermani
8005 – Schizura ipomoeae, morning-glory prominent moth
8006 – Schizura badia, chestnut schizura moth
8007 – Schizura unicornis, unicorn caterpillar moth
8008 – Schizura errucata
8009 – Schizura apicalis, plaine schizura moth
8010 – Schizura concinna, red-humped caterpillar moth
8011 – Schizura leptinoides, black-blotched schizura moth
8012 – Oligocentria semirufescens, red-washed prominent moth
8013 – Oligocentria alpica
8014 – Oligocentria pallida, pale prominent moth
8015 – Oligocentria coloradensis
8016 – Oligocentria perangulata
8017 – Oligocentria lignicolor, white-streaked prominent moth
8018 – Oligocentria pinalensis
8019 – Oligocentria paradisus
8020 – Oligocentria delicata
8021 – Euhyparpax rosea
8022 – Hyparpax aurora, pink prominent moth
8023 – Hyparpax venus
8024 – Hyparpax minor
8025 – Hyparpax aurostriata
8026 – Hyparpax perophoroides
8027 – Lirimiris truncata
8028 – Crinodes biedermani
8029 – Pseudhapigia brunnea
8030 – Hemiceras cadmia
8031 – Phryganidia californica, California oak moth
8032 – Zunacetha annulata

Arctiidae
no number yet – Aclytia heber
8033 – Gnophaela clappiana
8034 – Gnophaela latipennis
8035 – Gnophaela aequinoctialis
8036 – Gnophaela discreta
8037 – Gnophaela vermiculata, police car moth
8037.1 – Dysschema leucophaea
8038 – Composia fidelissima, faithful beauty moth
8038.1 – Hypocrita escuintla
8039 – Phaloesia saucia, saucy beauty moth
8040 – Dysschema howardi, northern giant flag moth
8041 – Doa ampla
8042 – Leuculodes lacteolaria
8043 – Eilema bicolor, bicolored moth
8045 – Crambidia lithosioides, dark gray lichen moth
8045.1 – Crambidia pallida, pale lichen moth
8046 – Crambidia uniformis, uniform lichen moth
8047 – Crambidia dusca
8048 – Crambidia myrlosea
8049 – Crambidia suffusa
8050 – Crambidia impura
8051 – Crambidia casta, pearly-winged lichen moth
8052 – Crambidia pura, pure lichen moth
8053 – Crambidia cephalica, yellow-headed lichen moth
8054 – Agylla septentrionalis
8055 – Inopsis modulata
8056 – Inopsis funerea
8057 – Gnamptonychia ventralis
8058 – Gardinia anopla
8059 – Cisthene subrufa
8060 – Cisthene unifascia
8061 – Cisthene kentuckiensis, Kentucky lichen moth
8062 – Cisthene liberomacula
8063 – Cisthene deserta
8064 – Cisthene faustinula
8065 – Cisthene dorsimacula
8066 – Cisthene tenuifascia, thin-banded lichen moth
8067 – Cisthene plumbea, lead-colored lichen moth
8068 – Cisthene striata, striated lichen moth
8069 – Cisthene perrosea
8070 – Cisthene angelus, angel lichen moth
8071 – Cisthene subjecta, subject lichen moth
8072 – Cisthene packardii, Packard's lichen moth
8073 – Cisthene conjuncta
8074 – Cisthene barnesii
8075 – Cisthene picta
8076 – Cisthene juanita
8077 – Cisthene coronado
8078 – Cisthene martini
8079 – Ptychoglene coccinea
8080 – Ptychoglene phrada
8081 – Ptychoglene sanguineola
8082 – Propyria schausi
8083 – Lycomorpha grotei
8084 – Lycomorpha regulus
8085 – Lycomorpha fulgens
8086 – Lycomorpha splendens
8087 – Lycomorpha pholus, black-and-yellow lichen moth
8088 – Lycomorpha desertus
8089 – Hypoprepia miniata, scarlet-winged lichen moth
8090 – Hypoprepia fucosa, painted lichen moth
8091 – Hypoprepia cadaverosa
8092 – Hypoprepia inculta
8093 – Haematomis uniformis
8093.1 – Rhabdatomis laudamia
8093.2 – Lycomorphodes sordida
8094 – Bruceia pulverina
8095 – Bruceia hubbardi
8096 – Eudesmia arida, arid eudesmia moth
8097 – Eudesmia menea
8098 – Clemensia albata, little white lichen moth
8099 – Pagara simplex, mouse-colored lichen moth
8100 – Trocodima fuscipes
8101 – Neoplynes eudora
8102 – Afrida ydatodes, Dyar's lichen moth
8103 – Afrida minuta
8103.1 – Afrida exegens
8104 – Comachara cadburyi, Cadbury's lichen moth
8104.1 – Acsala anomala
8105 – Utetheisa ornatrix, ornate bella moth
8107 – Haploa clymene, Clymene moth
8108 – Haploa colona, colona moth
8109 – Haploa reversa, reversed haploa moth
8110 – Haploa contigua, neighbor moth
8111 – Haploa lecontei, Leconte's haploa moth
8112 – Haploa confusa, confused haploa moth
8113 – Tyria jacobaeae, cinnabar moth
8114 – Virbia laeta, joyful holomelina moth
8115 – Virbia costata
8116 – Virbia ostenta
8118 – Virbia opella, tawny holomelina moth
8118.1 – Virbia fergusoni
8119 – Virbia nigricans
8120 – Virbia lamae, bog holomelina moth
8120.1 – Virbia rindgei
8121 – Virbia aurantiaca, orange holomelina moth
8121.2 – Virbia marginata
8122 – Virbia rubicundaria, ruddy holomelina moth
8123 – Virbia ferruginosa, rusty holomelina moth
8124 – Virbia immaculata, immaculate holomelina moth
8125 – Virbia fragilis
8126 – Leptarctia californiae
8127 – Parasemia plantaginis, wood tiger moth
8128 – Dodia albertae
8128.1 – Dodia kononenkoi
8128.2 – Dodia verticalis
8128.3 – Dodia tarandus
8129 – Pyrrharctia isabella, Isabella tiger moth
8130 – Seirarctia echo, echo moth
8131 – Estigmene acrea, salt marsh moth
8132 – Estigmene albida
8133 – Spilosoma latipennis, pink-legged tiger moth
8134 – Spilosoma congrua, agreeable tiger moth
8135 – Spilosoma vestalis, Vestal tiger moth
8136 – Spilosoma dubia, dubious tiger moth
8137 – Spilosoma virginica, Virginian tiger moth
8138 – Spilosoma vagans
8139 – Spilosoma pteridis, brown tiger moth
8139.1 – Spilosoma danbyi
8140 – Hyphantria cunea, fall webworm moth
8141 – Euerythra phasma, red-tailed specter moth
8142 – Euerythra trimaculata, three-spotted specter moth
8143 – Alexicles aspersa
8144 – Hypercompe permaculata, many-spotted tiger moth
8146 – Hypercompe scribonia, giant leopard moth
8147 – Hypercompe caudata
8148 – Hypercompe oslari
8149 – Hypercompe suffusa
8150 – Arachnis zuni
8151 – Arachnis nedyma
8151.1 – Arachnis citra
8152 – Arachnis picta, painted tiger moth
8155 – Arachnis aulaea, tiger moth
8156 – Phragmatobia fuliginosa, ruby tiger moth
8157 – Phragmatobia lineata, lined ruby tiger moth
8158 – Phragmatobia assimilans, large ruby tiger moth
8158.1 – Sonorarctia fervida
8159 – Neoarctia brucei
8160 – Neoarctia beanii
8160.1 – Neoarctia lafontainei
8161 – Holoarctia sordida
8161.1 – Holoarctia puengeleri
8162 – Platarctia parthenos, St. Lawrence tiger moth
8163 – Platyprepia virginalis, ranchman's tiger moth
8164 – Acerbia alpina
8165 – Pararctia lapponica
8165.1 – Pararctia subnebulosa
8165.2 – Pararctia yarrowii
8166 – Arctia caja, great tiger moth
8166.1 – Arctia opulenta, tiger moth
8166.2 – Arctia brachyptera
8166.3 – Arctia olschwangi
8167 – Kodiosoma fulvum
8169 – Apantesis phalerata, harnessed tiger moth
8170 – Apantesis vittata, banded tiger moth
8171 – Apantesis nais, Nais tiger moth
8171.1 – Apantesis carlotta, Carlotta's tiger moth
8172 – Grammia quenseli
8172.1 – Grammia margo
8173 – Grammia cervinoides
8174 – Holarctia obliterata
8175 – Grammia virguncula, little virgin tiger moth
8175.1 – Grammia speciosa
8175.3 – Grammia philipiana
8176 – Grammia anna, Anna tiger moth
8177 – Grammia ornata
8177.1 – Grammia edwardsii
8177.2 – Grammia complicata
8178 – Grammia hewletti
8179 – Grammia nevadensis, Nevada tiger moth
8179.1 – Grammia eureka
8179.2 – Grammia bowmani
8179.3 – Grammia behrii
8179.4 – Grammia yukona
8179.5 – Grammia brillians
8179.6 – Grammia fergusoni
8180 – Grammia incorrupta
8181 – Notarctia proxima, Mexican tiger moth
8181.1 – Notarctia arizoniensis
8183 – Grammia bolanderi
8184 – Grammia elongata
8184.1 – Grammia yavapai
8185 – Grammia blakei
8186 – Grammia williamsii, Williams' tiger moth
8186.1 – Grammia allectans
8186.2 – Grammia ursina
8187.1 – Grammia franconia
8188 – Grammia figurata, figured tiger moth
8189 – Grammia f-pallida
8191 – Grammia placentia, Placentia tiger moth
8193 – Grammia favorita
8194 – Grammia phyllira, phyllira tiger moth
8196 – Grammia parthenice, parthenice tiger moth
8197 – Grammia virgo, virgin tiger moth
8198 – Grammia doris, Doris tiger moth
8199 – Grammia arge, Arge moth
8200 – Hyperborea czekanowskii
8201 – Hypocrisias minima
8202 – Halysidota cinctipes, Florida tussock moth
8203 – Halysidota tessellaris, banded tussock moth
8204 – Halysidota harrisii, sycamore tussock moth
8205 – Halysidota davisii, Davis' tussock moth
8205.1 – Halysidota schausi, Schaus' tussock moth
8206 – Lophocampa roseata
8207 – Lophocampa significans
8208 – Lophocampa ingens
8209 – Lophocampa argentata, silver-spotted tiger moth
8210 – Lophocampa sobrina
8211 – Lophocampa caryae, hickory tussock moth
8212 – Lophocampa mixta
8213 – Lophocampa pura
8214 – Lophocampa maculata, spotted tussock moth
8215 – Lophocampa indistincta
8216 – Lophocampa annulosa, Santa Ana tussock moth
8217 – Leucanopsis longa, long-streaked tussock moth
8217.1 – Leucanopsis perdentata
8217.2 – Leucanopsis lurida
8218 – Pseudohemihyalea ambigua
8219 – Apocrisias thaumasta
8220 – Pseudohemihyalea splendens
8221 – Pseudohemihyalea labecula
8222 – Pseudohemihyalea edwardsii, Edwards' glassy-wing moth
8224 – Calidota laqueata, streaked calidota moth
8225 – Opharus muricolor
8226 – Carales arizonensis
8227 – Pareuchaetes insulata, yellow-winged pareuchaetes moth
8228 – Cycnia inopinatus, unexpected cycnia moth
8229 – Cycnia collaris
8229.1 – Cycnia tenerosa
8230 – Cycnia tenera, delicate cycnia moth
8231 – Cycnia oregonensis, Oregon cycnia moth
8232 – Euchaetes zella
8233 – Euchaetes perlevis
8234 – Euchaetes fusca
8235 – Euchaetes helena
8236 – Euchaetes castalla
8237 – Euchaetes elegans
8238 – Euchaetes egle, milkweed tussock moth
8239 – Euchaetes gigantea
8240 – Euchaetes polingi
8241 – Euchaetes bolteri
8242 – Euchaetes antica
8243 – Euchaetes albicosta
8244 – Pygoctenucha terminalis
8245 – Pygoctenucha pyrrhoura
8246 – Lerina incarnata, crimson-bodied lichen moth
8247 – Ectypia bivittata
8248 – Ectypia mexicana
8249 – Ectypia clio, Clio tiger moth
8250 – Pygarctia murina
8250.1 – Pygarctia pterygostigma
8251 – Pygarctia neomexicana
8252 – Pygarctia lorula
8253 – Pygarctia roseicapitis
8253.1 – Pygarctia flavidorsalis
8254 – Pygarctia spraguei, Sprague's pygarctia moth
8255 – Pygarctia abdominalis, yellow-edged pygarctia moth
8256 – Pygarctia eglenensis
8256.1 – Purius superpulverea
8256.2 – Agaraea semivitrea
8256.3 – Biturix venosata
8257 – Eupseudosoma involuta, snowy eupseudosoma moth
8258 – Bertholdia trigona, Grote's bertholdia moth
8259 – Neritos prophaea
8260 – Ctenucha venosa, veined ctenucha moth
8261 – Ctenucha cressonana
8262 – Ctenucha virginica, Virginia ctenucha moth
8263 – Ctenucha multifaria
8264 – Ctenucha rubroscapus
8265 – Ctenucha brunnea, brown ctenucha moth
8266 – Dahana atripennis, black-winged dahana moth
8267 – Cisseps fulvicollis, yellow-collared scape moth
8268 – Cisseps packardii
8269 – Cisseps wrightii
8269.1 – Phoenicoprocta lydia, Lydia tiger moth
8270 – Lymire edwardsii, Edwards' wasp moth
8270.1 – Eucereon myrina
8270.2 – Eucereon erythrolepis
8271 – Nelphe carolina, little Carol's wasp moth
8271.1 – Nelphe relegatum
8272 – Empyreuma pugione, spotted oleander caterpillar moth
8273 – Macrocneme chrysitis, southern cyan tiger moth
8274.1 – Apeplopoda mecrida
8275 – Episcepsis inornata
8276 – Psilopleura vittata
8276.1 – Psilopleura polia
8276.2 – Pseudosphex leovazquezae
8277 – Myrmecopsis strigosa
8278 – Cosmosoma festivum
8279 – Cosmosoma teuthras
8280 – Cosmosoma myrodora, scarlet-bodied wasp moth
8281 – Didasys belae, double-tufted wasp moth
8282 – Syntomeida ipomoeae, yellow-banded wasp moth
8283 – Syntomeida melanthus, black-banded wasp moth
8284 – Syntomeida epilais, polka-dot wasp moth
8285 – Phoenicoprocta hampsonii
8286 – Pseudocharis minima, lesser wasp moth
8286.1 – Poliopastea clavipes
8287 – Horama panthalon, Texas wasp moth
8288 – Horama plumipes

Lymantriidae
8290 – Gynaephora rossii
8291 – Gynaephora groenlandica
8292 – Dasychira tephra, tephra tussock moth
8293 – Dasychira dorsipennata, sharp-lined tussock moth
8294 – Dasychira vagans, variable tussock moth
8295 – Dasychira mescalera
8296 – Dasychira basiflava, yellow-based tussock moth
8297 – Dasychira matheri
8298 – Dasychira meridionalis, southern tussock moth
8299 – Dasychira atrivenosa
8300 – Dasychira cinnamomea, cinnamon tussock moth
8301 – Dasychira leucophaea
8302 – Dasychira obliquata, streaked tussock moth
8303 – Dasychira dominickaria
8304 – Dasychira plagiata, northern pine tussock moth
8305 – Dasychira pinicola, pine tussock moth
8306 – Dasychira grisefacta
8307 – Dasychira manto, Manto tussock moth
8308 – Orgyia antiqua, rusty tussock moth
8309 – Orgyia vetusta, western tussock moth
8310 – Orgyia magna
8311 – Orgyia cana
8312 – Orgyia pseudotsugata, Douglas fir tussock moth
8313 – Orgyia detrita, fir tussock moth
8314 – Orgyia definita, definite tussock moth
8315 – Orgyia leuschneri
8316 – Orgyia leucostigma, white-marked tussock moth
8317 – Orgyia falcata
8318 – Lymantria dispar, gypsy moth
8319 – Leucoma salicis, satin moth
8320 – Euproctis chrysorrhoea, browntail moth
8321 – Euproctis similis

See also
List of butterflies of North America
List of Lepidoptera of Hawaii
List of moths of Canada
List of butterflies of Canada

External links
Checklists of North American Moths

Moths of North America
North America